Georgia Equality (previously the Georgia Equality Project) is the largest LGBTQ rights advocacy group in Georgia. Their mission is to advance fairness, safety and opportunity for lesbian, gay, bisexual, transgender, queer and allied communities in Georgia. Their work has included political endorsements, boycotts, protests, advertising campaigns, and lobbying.

It is based in Atlanta and was founded in 1995. A Savannah chapter was formed in 1998, and is the only chapter outside of Atlanta. The organization is a member of the Equality Federation.

See also

 LGBT rights in Georgia (U.S. state)
 LGBT history in Georgia (U.S. state) 
 List of LGBT rights organizations

References

External links
 

LGBT political advocacy groups in Georgia (U.S. state)
1995 establishments in Georgia (U.S. state)
Organizations based in Atlanta
Organizations established in 1995
Charities based in Georgia (U.S. state)
Equality Federation
LGBT culture in Atlanta
LGBT in Georgia (U.S. state)